Priobium carpini is a species of death-watch beetle in the family Ptinidae. It is found in Europe and Northern Asia (excluding China) and North America.

References

Further reading

 
 
 
 

Anobiinae
Articles created by Qbugbot
Beetles described in 1793